Cornelis Dusseldorp (28 June 1908 – 11 March 1990) was a Dutch rower. He competed in the men's coxed pair event at the 1928 Summer Olympics.

References

1908 births
1990 deaths
Dutch male rowers
Olympic rowers of the Netherlands
Rowers at the 1928 Summer Olympics
People from Kebumen Regency